The 2020 REV Group Grand Prix Doubleheader was an IndyCar Series event scheduled July 11–12, 2020. It made up the third and fourth rounds of the series' 2020 season. The race was originally scheduled for June 21, but was postponed due to the COVID-19 pandemic. In addition, the weekend was turned in to a double-header event in an effort to make up for races outright cancelled by the pandemic. The race was also the first event of the 2020 season to allow spectators at the track, with track promoters allowing unrestricted attendance.

Race 1 – July 11
All sessions for race 1 took place on Saturday, July 11.

Qualifying
Qualifying began at 2:15 CDT. As the event was doubleheader, series rules meant qualifying was a single round (instead of two rounds as normal), split into two groups.  Drivers from the group with the fastest driver having the better time started in the odd number positions, while the group whose fastest time was worse than the other group took even number positions.

Race
The race was held at 5:15 EST. 

Notes:
 Points include 1 point for leading at least 1 lap during a race, an additional 2 points for leading the most race laps, 1 point for Pole Position, and 1 point for the winner of the non-pole qualifying group.

Race statistics

Average speed: 

Lead changes: 5

Championship standings after the race
Drivers' Championship standings

Race 2 – July 12
All sessions for race 2 took place on Sunday, July 12.

Qualifying
Qualifying took place at 10:00 a.m. EST

Race
The race took place at 12:40 p.m. EST.

Race statistics

Average speed: 

Lead changes: 8

Championship standings after the race
Drivers' Championship standings

References

2020 in IndyCar
2020 in sports in Wisconsin
July 2020 sports events in the United States